José Gomes (born 8 April 1999), sometimes known as Zé Gomes, is a Portuguese professional footballer who plays for Universitatea Cluj on loan from Romanian Liga I side CFR Cluj as a striker.

Club career
Born in Bissau, Gomes, after participating in a 2011 youth tournament in Portugal, returned to the country a year later to join Benfica's youth academy at the age of 13.

Gomes made his professional debut with Benfica B in a 2016–17 LigaPro match against Cova da Piedade on 6 August 2016. 22 days later, he scored his first goal for the reserve team in a 2–1 away win at Vizela. He debuted for the first-team, playing only 128 seconds, in a 2–1 win at Arouca in Primeira Liga on 9 September, becoming Benfica's third youngest player to debut for the main team.

Gomes was loaned to fellow top-flight team Portimonense for 2019–20. Having made only one substitute appearance against Gil Vicente, he headed to Lechia Gdańsk of the Polish Ekstraklasa in February 2020, for the rest of the season. He managed only one goal during his time on the Baltic Sea coast, in a 3–2 loss away to Lech Poznań on 12 July.

On 15 February, Gomes moved to Bulgaria, signing with Cherno More.

On 4 February 2022, Gomes signed with Italian Serie C club Seregno

In January 2023, Gomes joined rivals Universitate Cluj on loan until the end of the season with the option to purchase.

International career
At the 2016 UEFA European Under-17 Championship, Gomes was crowned both Golden Player and top scorer.

Club statistics

Honours
Benfica
Primeira Liga: 2016–17
Taça de Portugal: 2016–17

Lechia Gdańsk
Polish Cup runner-up: 2019–20

Portugal U17
UEFA European Under-17 Championship: 2016

Portugal U19
UEFA European Under-19 Championship: 2018
Individual
2016 UEFA European Under-17 Championship Top goalscorer (7 goals)
2016 UEFA European Under-17 Championship Team of the Tournament
2016 UEFA European Under-17 Championship - Golden Player Award

References

External links

1999 births
Living people
Sportspeople from Bissau
Naturalised citizens of Portugal
Portuguese footballers
Portugal youth international footballers
Bissau-Guinean emigrants to Portugal
Portuguese sportspeople of Bissau-Guinean descent
Association football forwards
S.L. Benfica B players
S.L. Benfica footballers
Portimonense S.C. players
Lechia Gdańsk players
PFC Cherno More Varna players
U.S. 1913 Seregno Calcio players
CFR Cluj players
FC Universitatea Cluj players
Liga Portugal 2 players
Primeira Liga players
Ekstraklasa players
First Professional Football League (Bulgaria) players
Serie C players
Portuguese expatriate footballers
Expatriate footballers in Poland
Expatriate footballers in Bulgaria
Expatriate footballers in Italy
Expatriate footballers in Romania
Portuguese expatriate sportspeople in Poland
Portuguese expatriate sportspeople in Bulgaria
Portuguese expatriate sportspeople in Italy
Portuguese expatriate sportspeople in Romania
Black Portuguese sportspeople